Sicherman is a surname. Notable people with the surname include:

 George Sicherman, inventor of the Sicherman dice
 Harvey Sicherman (1945–2010), American writer and foreign policy expert

See also
 Scherman